Vitrac is a commune in the Dordogne department in Nouvelle-Aquitaine in southwestern France. The Château de Montfort is situated in the commune.

Population

See also
Communes of the Dordogne department

References

Communes of Dordogne